Chatelaine may refer to:

Chatelaine (chain), a set of short chains on a belt worn by women and men for carrying keys, thimble and/or sewing kit, etc.
Chatelaine (horse), a racehorse
Chatelaine (magazine), an English-language Canadian women's magazine
Châtelaine, a French-Canadian counterpart to that magazine
Châtelaine, Switzerland, a village in the municipality of Vernier, near Geneva

See also

Châtelain (feminine châtelaine), the keeper of a castle
Chatelain (disambiguation)
Chastel (disambiguation)
Chatel (disambiguation)
Chateau (disambiguation)